The Girls in Smaland (Swedish: Flickorna i Småland) is a 1945 Swedish romantic drama film directed by Schamyl Bauman and starring Sickan Carlsson, Åke Grönberg and Sigge Fürst. It was shot at the Centrumateljéerna Studios in Stockholm. The film's sets were designed by the art director Arthur Spjuth. It takes its title from the popular 1912 song of the same title.

Synpsis
Gunnar takes a train to Vimmerby to look for work. The area is famous for beautiful woman, but he lands a job as a farmhand on the mean-spirited male farmer Jönsson's property. When he grows tired of this he finds a new job with a female farm owner Christina Larsson, but she is nothing like he expected.

Cast
 Sickan Carlsson as 	Christina Larsson
 Åke Grönberg as 	Gunnar
 Sigge Fürst as 	Algotsson
 Ruth Kasdan as 	Tattar-Emma
 Douglas Håge as 	Jönsson
 Carl Reinholdz as Alfred Forsman
 Rut Holm as 	Hanna
 Ingrid Östergren as 	Märtha
 John Elfström as 	Laban
 Carin Swensson as Ottilia
 Ninni Löfberg as 	Ester
 Olga Appellöf as Woman
 Kolbjörn Knudsen as Måns
 Nils Hallberg as 	Gypsy
 Artur Rolén as 	Photographer
 Viktor Haak as Daniel ve Korsgrinna
 Gösta Prüzelius as Agronomist
 Stig Johanson as	Man
 Siegfried Fischer as 	Potential horse buyer
 Mona Geijer-Falkner as Old woman at the market
 John Hilke as 	Employment agency clerk
 Birger Lensander as Farm hand kicked out by Jönsson 
 Aurore Palmgren as Grandmother 
 Andrew Walter as 	Accordion player 
 Tom Walter as Train driver 
 Inga-Lill Åhström as 	Waitress

References

Bibliography 
 Per Olov Qvist & Peter von Bagh. Guide to the Cinema of Sweden and Finland. Greenwood Publishing Group, 2000.

External links 
 

1945 films
1945 drama films
Swedish drama films
1940s Swedish-language films
Films directed by Schamyl Bauman
1940s Swedish films